Arno Morales is a Filipino actor.

Personal life
The fourth of five children, Arno Udo Palisoc Fuchs, also known as "Arno Morales", was born to a German father, Udo Fuchs, and a Filipina mother, Willhelma Palisoc Fuchs, on June 18, 1993.

Filmography

References

Star Magic
Living people
Filipino people of German descent
1993 births